Europe of Nations and Freedom (ENF; , ENL) was a political group in the European Parliament launched on 15 June 2015. The group was the smallest within the European Parliament during the eighth European Parliament term with 37 members. The largest faction in the group  was the French National Rally with 17 MEPs.  Twenty-eight members were part of the Movement for a Europe of Nations and Freedom (MENF), with the remaining nine MEPs being their ideological allies. The ENF was the parliamentary group of the Movement for a Europe of Nations and Freedom although some MEPs were without any European affiliations.

The group was replaced for the ninth European Parliament on 13 June 2019 by the Identity and Democracy group.

History
Following the 2014 European elections on 22–25 May 2014, the European Alliance for Freedom (EAF), comprising right-wing and far-right parties from across Europe, aimed to form a stable parliamentary group in the European Parliament prior to the start of the 8th term. A previous attempt to form a far-right group in the European parliament during the 6th term was the short-lived Identity, Tradition, Sovereignty (ITS) group in 2007.

On 28 May 2014, it was announced at a press conference in Brussels that the alliance led by Marine Le Pen of the French National Front (FN) and Geert Wilders of the Dutch Party for Freedom (PVV), including Northern League (LN) leader Matteo Salvini, were in negotiations to form a parliamentary group. On 24 June 2014, it was announced that the Le Pen/Wilders alliance had failed to gather the requisite 25 MEPs from seven EU member nations, thus starting the parliamentary term as Non-Inscrits members. Later in 2014, the EAF was succeeded by the Movement for a Europe of Nations and Freedom (MENL), without the participation of the PVV.

On 15 June 2015, Marine Le Pen announced that a new group in the European Parliament would be launched the following day, set to comprise MEPs from the FN, PVV, LN, the Freedom Party of Austria (FPÖ), Flemish Interest (VB), the Polish Congress of the New Right (KNP) and former UK Independence Party member Janice Atkinson. Together with the availability of the excluded UKIP MEP, the creation of the group with representation from seven member states was made possible by the recent side-lining of two historical but controversial figures of the far-right: Jean-Marie Le Pen was suspended by his own National Front, while Janusz Korwin-Mikke's departure from the KNP allowed Marine Le Pen and Wilders to accept the two remaining members of the party in their group, something they had rejected during the discussions held in June 2014. Among the FN delegation, Bruno Gollnisch chose not to join in solidarity with former president Jean-Marie Le Pen, while Aymeric Chauprade, on a trip to Fiji, joined a few days later. One of the four seats won by the PVV was vacant at the time of the group's creation until 8 September 2015, when Auke Zijlstra replaced Hans Jansen, who had died on 5 May 2015.

In July 2015, the European Parliament decided the group would earn €3 million per year from EU funds. By adding up all the grants for the group as well as for the linked political party and think tank, the funds will amount to €17.5 million for the next four years of their mandate.

On 15 July 2015, Romanian MEP Laurențiu Rebega left both the Conservative Party and the S&D group to join the ENF. On 9 November 2015 Aymeric Chauprade left the group.

Reviewing votes in the EU Parliament on resolutions critical of Russia or measures not in the Kremlin's interests (e.g., the Ukraine-EU Association Agreement), Hungary's Political Capital Institute found that future members of the ENF voted "no" in 93% of cases.

The first convention of the ENL took place on 28 & 29 January 2016 in Milan with all the leaders of ENL's member parties along with Freedom and Direct Democracy (SPD) leader Tomio Okamura, whose party is not a member of the ENL as it has no MEPs. During this convention, each leader made a speech followed by a press conference the next day.

During the Alternative for Germany (AfD) party convention on 30 April 2016, it was announced that Marcus Pretzell MEP would join the ENL group. The AfD's other MEP Beatrix von Storch joined the Europe of Freedom and Direct Democracy (EFDD) group in March 2016, both MEPs having been expelled from the ECR group.

On 2 October 2017, 3 MEPs left the Front National and joined the EFDD group two days later.

On 2 March 2018, Romanian MEP Laurențiu Rebega left the group.

In May 2018, another MEP, Bernard Monot, left the Front National to join the EFDD group.

In January 2019, three UK Independence Party MEPs joined the group.  In April 2019, one of those MEPs, Jane Collins, returned to the EFDD group.

On 12 June 2019, following the 2019 European Parliament elections, the successor group to ENF was announced as Identity and Democracy group, to be launched the following day.

Member parties before being dissolved
The ENF group had members from eight countries.

Former members

Leadership
Co-President: Nicolas Bay
Co-President: Marcel de Graaff
Vice-President: Gerolf Annemans
Vice-President: Janice Atkinson
Vice-President: Michał Marusik
Vice-President: Marcus Pretzell
Vice-President: Matteo Salvini
Vice-President: Harald Vilimsky

See also
 European Alliance of Peoples and Nations
Europe of Freedom and Direct Democracy

References

External links 
 
 

2015 establishments in the European Union
European Parliament party groups
Eurosceptic parties
Political parties established in 2015
Political parties disestablished in 2019
Right-wing politics in Europe
Right-wing populism in Europe
Far-right politics in Europe
Marine Le Pen